This is a list of radio stations in Kyiv, Ukraine. There are 27 radio stations in Ukraine.

Radio Stations

External links

Ukrainian

Radio in Ukraine